The Leopard is a 1963 epic historical drama film directed by Luchino Visconti. Written by Visconti, Enrico Medioli, Massimo Franciosa, Suso Cecchi d'Amico, Pasquale Festa Campanile and René Barjavel, the film is an adaptation of the 1958 novel of the same title by Giuseppe Tomasi di Lampedusa.

Burt Lancaster stars as Don Fabrizio Corbera, an aging Sicilian nobleman caught up in the sociopolitical turmoil of the Risorgimento (Italian unification) during the mid-19th century, with Alain Delon as his opportunistic nephew Tancredi, and Claudia Cardinale as his goddaughter. Paolo Stoppa, Rina Morelli, Romolo Valli, Terence Hill and Serge Reggiani play supporting roles. The film was an international co-production between Italian studio Titanus and French studio Pathé.

The Leopard won the Palme d’Or at the 1963 Cannes Film Festival, and was released theatrically in Italy on March 28, 1963, and in France on June 14. It was a critical and commercial success in Europe, but reception was more lukewarm in the United States, where a truncated, English-dubbed cut was released. Retrospective reviews, drawn from the film's longer original cut, have been more positive, and the film is now widely regarded as a classic and one of the greatest movies ever made.

Plot
In Sicily in the year 1860, Don Fabrizio Corbera, Prince of Salina, enjoys the customary comforts and privileges of his ancestry. War has broken out between the armies of Francis II of the Two Sicilies and the insurgent volunteer redshirts of Giuseppe Garibaldi. Among the rebels is the Prince's nephew, Tancredi, whose romantic politics the Prince hesitantly accepts with some whimsical sympathy. Upset by the uprising, the Prince departs to Palermo. Garibaldi's army subjugate the city and expropriate Sicily from the Bourbons. The Prince muses upon the inevitability of change, with the middle class displacing the ruling class while on the surface everything remains the same. Refusing to bend to the tide of changes, the Prince departs to his summer palace at Donnafugata.

A new national assembly calls a plebiscite and the nationalists win 512–0, thanks to the corruption and support of the town's leading citizen, Don Calogero Sedara. Don Calogero is invited to the villa of the Salinas, and he brings his daughter Angelica with him. Both the Prince and Tancredi are taken by Angelica's beauty. Soon thereafter, Tancredi makes plans to ask for her hand in marriage.

The Prince sees the wisdom of the match because he knows that, due to his nephew's vaulting ambition, Tancredi will be in need of ready cash, which Angelica's father will happily provide. With the blessing of both the Prince of Salina and Don Calogero, Tancredi and Angelica get engaged.

A visitor from the constituent assembly comes to the villa. He pleads with the noblemen gathered there to join the senate and to guide the state; he hopes that the Prince's great compassion and wisdom will help alleviate the perceived poverty and alleged ignorance on the streets of Sicily. However, the Prince demurs and refuses this invitation, observing that Sicily prefers its traditions to the delusions of modernity because its people are proud of their ancient heritage. He sees a future where the leopards and the lions, along with the sheep and the jackals, will all live according to the same law, but he does not want to be a part of this democratic vision.

He notices that Tancredi has shifted allegiance from the insurgent Garibaldi to King Vittorio's newly-formed army, and wistfully judges that his nephew is the kind of opportunist and time-server who will flourish in the new Italy.

A great ball is held at the villa of a neighbouring Prince which is attended by the Salinas including Tancredi. Afflicted by a combination of melancholia and the ridiculousness of the nouveau riche, the Prince wanders forlornly from chamber to chamber, increasingly disaffected by the entire edifice of the society he so gallantly represents – until Angelica approaches and asks him to dance. Stirred and momentarily released from his cares, the Prince accepts, and once again he recaptures and presents the elegant and dashing figure of his past.

However, he becomes disenchanted and leaves the ball alone.  He asks Tancredi to arrange carriages for his family, and walks with a heavy heart to a dark alley that symbolises Italy's inordinate and fading past which he inhabits.

Cast

Production

Development

The original novel had been a bestseller and won the Strega Prize, Italy's most prestigious literary award. In August 1960, Italian studio Titanus Film announced that they would make a film based on the novel in Sicily the following summer on a budget of at least $2 million. The movie would be an Italian-American co-production, shot in various languages, with a combination of Italian and American stars. Ettore Giannini was preparing a script although it was expected he would collaborate with another writer to finish it.

Several treatments were reportedly done before Visconti became involved. "The book is seen through the eyes of a Sicilian prince who has no sense of the people", said Visconti. "The people were fooled by Garibaldi and then they were destroyed by the Piedmontese. The popular conscience was strangled by the way the Piedmont upper class tried to keep the social structure of the south just as it was."

In July 1961, MGM announced they had signed a co-production deal with Titanus to make the movie. Warren Beatty was in discussions with Visconti to play the nephew, while Visconti approached Laurence Olivier and Spencer Tracy to play the lead.

Visconti was told by producers that they needed to cast a star in order to ensure that they would earn enough money to justify the big budget. The producers recommended that the star should be either Gregory Peck, Anthony Quinn, Spencer Tracy or Burt Lancaster. The producers chose Hollywood star Lancaster without consulting Visconti, which insulted the director and caused tension on the set; but Visconti and Lancaster ended up working well together, and their resulting friendship lasted the rest of their lives.

In November, Lancaster agreed to play the lead with filming to start in April. Lancaster said he had been "long fascinated" with The Leopard even before being offered the role. "I think it is the best written and most perceptive study of a man and his background that has appeared for many years." He had doubts about accepting the part because "the novel was so perfect as a novel" but decided to accept.

In April 1962, 20th Century Fox announced it had bought the distribution rights to the movie.

Shooting

Filming started in May 1962 in Palermo. The first two weeks of the two-month location shoot in Sicily were dedicated to battle scenes. After 22 weeks of location scenes, interiors would be shot in Rome. The ball scene (over 44 minutes) in Palazzo Valguarnera-Gangi in Palermo became famous for its duration and opulence.

Lancaster called Visconti "the finest director I've ever worked with." All the scenes with Lancaster would be shot in English, and dubbed into Italian for the Italian version; other scenes would be filmed in Italian then dubbed into English for the English version. Lancaster was dubbed by Corrado Gaipa, and his French co-star Alain Delon was dubbed by Carlo Sabatini. Archibald Colquhoun worked as dialogue director.

By May 1963, it was reported the film had cost Titanus $5 million.

Versions
The Leopard has circulated in at least four different versions:
 Visconti's initial workprint was 205 minutes long, but was felt to be excessive in length by both the director and producer, and was shortened to 195 minutes for its Cannes Film Festival premiere. 
 Visconti then cut the film further to 185 minutes for its official release, and considered this version to be his preferred one.
 The U.S English-dubbed version, in which the Italian and French actors were dubbed over (except for Burt Lancaster, who re-dubbed his own dialogue), was edited down to 161 minutes by its distributor 20th Century Fox. This was done without Visconti's input, and he was unhappy with the cuts, dubbing and print. Visconti threatened to sue Fox, who threatened to counter-sue the director, arguing that Lancaster supervised the American cut. "I don't feel it's my film at all," he said of this version.

Release
The film debuted at the 1963 Cannes Film Festival where it won the Palme d'Or.

The 185-minute edition was re-released in the US in 1983.

Reception

Box office
The film was successful in Europe. It grossed $370,000 in its first 10 days from 8 Italian cities and was the sixth most popular film of the year at the French box office, with admissions of 3,688,024. Despite being cut for US release by Fox, the film didn't perform as well in the United States with theatrical rentals of $1.8 million.

Critical
At the time of its release in the summer of 1963, the majority of American critics panned the film. According to Newsweek, Lancaster looked "as if he's playing Clarence Day's Life with Father in summer stock." Jonathan Miller of The New Yorker derided Lancaster as "muzzled by whiskers and clearly stunned by the importance of his role." However, Time Magazine praised the characterization of the Leopard as solid and convincing.

Retrospective
New York magazine called the now-famous ballroom scene "almost unbearably moving." The New York Times wrote "The reappearance of this enchanting work proves that, under the right circumstances, two decades make no difference whatsoever but 25 minutes can transform a very good film into a possibly great one."

The film's reputation continues to rise. Director Martin Scorsese considers the film to be one of the greatest ever made.

In the decennial poll made by the British Film Institute, it was named the 57th greatest film of all time selected by critics. 

The site's critical consensus reads: "Lavish and wistful, The Leopard features epic battles, sumptuous costumes, and a ballroom waltz that competes for most beautiful sequence committed to film." On Metacritic, the 2004 re-release holds a perfect 100 out of 100 score based on 12 reviews, indicating "universal acclaim."

Awards and honors

Preservation 
The original 8-perforation Technirama camera negative for The Leopard survives and was used by The Criterion Collection to create their video master for DVD and Blu-ray, with color timing supervised by the film's cinematographer, Giuseppe Rotunno. New preservation film elements were created using a 4K digital scan of the film, done with the cooperation of the Cineteca di Bologna, L'Immagine Ritrovata, The Film Foundation, Gucci, Pathé, Fondation Jérôme Seydoux-Pathé, Twentieth Century Fox, and Centro Sperimentale di Cinematografia-Cineteca Nazionale.
This restoration premiered at the 2010 Cannes Film Festival.

Home media
There are several DVD editions available.
 Region 2 (Italy) The Medusa Home Entertainment release (released in 2001) contains the 185-minute Italian version with several bonus features and interviews. This release is not English-friendly.
 Region 2 (U.K.) The BFI Video release offers a restored version of the Italian cut with an audio commentary by David Forgacs and Rossana Capitano.
 Region 2 (Japan) The Toho release contains an unrestored version of the Italian cut in the original audio (Japanese subs), and a rare alternative English dubbed track (different from the shorter U.S version). Extras are text based bios and facts in Japanese. This release is also not English-friendly.
 Region 1 (U.S.) The Criterion Collection release is a 3-disc set containing a restored version of the 185-minute Italian version (with optional English subtitles), several bonus features, interviews, an audio commentary by Peter Cowie, and the 161-minute U.S English dubbed version as an extra.

Blu-ray release.

 Region A (U.S.) The Criterion Collection 2-disc Blu-ray set boasts a transfer of the 185-min Italian version in 1080P, most of the DVD bonus materials plus newly created ones, and the 161-minute U.S English dubbed version in 1080i.

References

External links 
 
 
 
 
 Remembrance of Things Past: The Leopard an essay by Michael Wood at the Criterion Collection

1963 films
1963 drama films
Italian historical drama films
Italian war drama films
Italian epic films
1960s Italian-language films
French historical drama films
French war drama films
French epic films
Films based on Italian novels
Films set in Palermo
Films set in the 1860s
Palme d'Or winners
Films directed by Luchino Visconti
Films with screenplays by Suso Cecchi d'Amico
Films scored by Nino Rota
Films shot in Palermo
Films shot in Lazio
Italian unification
Cultural depictions of Giuseppe Garibaldi
Giuseppe Tomasi di Lampedusa
1960s Italian films
1960s French films